Jutta Ploch (born 13 January 1960 in Weißenfels) is a German rower. From 1983, she competed under her married name Jutta Schenk.

References 
 
 

1960 births
Living people
East German female rowers
People from Weißenfels
Rowers at the 1980 Summer Olympics
Olympic gold medalists for East Germany
Olympic rowers of East Germany
Olympic medalists in rowing
World Rowing Championships medalists for East Germany
Medalists at the 1980 Summer Olympics
Sportspeople from Saxony-Anhalt